Seducing Charlie Barker is a 2010 American comedy film directed by Amy Glazer, starring Daphne Zuniga, Stephen Barker Turner, Heather Gordon and David Wilson Barnes. It is an adaptation of writer Theresa Rebeck's play The Scene.

Cast
 Daphne Zuniga as Stella
 Stephen Barker Turner as Charlie
 Heather Gordon as Clea
 David Wilson Barnes as Lewis
 Steve Cell as Nick
 Pamela Gaye Walker as Fiona
 Liam Vincent as Lou

Reception
Dennis Harvey of Variety wrote that Rebeck "excels" at character writing and dynamics while the performances "grasp their meaty opportunities with disciplined relish."

Frank Scheck of The Hollywood Reporter wrote that while the "storyline is hardly original", it "does provide the opportunity for Rebeck to unleash wickedly scathing observations about the sort of self-obsessed show business types who pursue their own interests no matter who it hurts". He also praised the performances, writing that Zuniga "provides just the right grace notes as the aggrieved wife", Turner "convincingly embodies Charlie’s sweaty desperation", and Gordon "displays such sexual abandon that there won’t be a male in the audience who won’t identify with her hapless victim."

Jeannette Catsoulis of The New York Times wrote that while Gordon "runs her mouth and works her curves like a champ — and ingeniously redirects our sympathies during a climactic bedroom confrontation", her performance is "almost too brittle", and "words bounce off her without making a dent", leaving the film "with little to do but hover anxiously over a marriage we don’t care about and a talent we are never persuaded exists."

References

External links
 
 

American comedy films
2010 comedy films